The year 2021 is the 11th year in the history of the ONE Championship, a mixed martial arts, kickboxing and Muay Thai promotion based in Singapore.

ONE Championship 2021 Awards 
The following fighters won the ONE Championship year-end awards for 2021
 ONE Championship MMA Fighter of the Year 2021: Ok Rae Yoon
 ONE Championship MMA Female Fighter of the Year 2021: Stamp Fairtex
 ONE Championship MMA Fight for the Year: Dagi Arslanaliev vs. Timofey Nastyukhin
 ONE Championship MMA Knockout of the Year 2021: Adriano Moraes against Demetrious Johnson (ONE 132: ONE on TNT 1)
 ONE Championship Submission of the Year 2021: Shinya Aoki against James Nakashima (ONE 126: Unbreakable)
 ONE Super Series Fighter of the Year 2021: Superbon Banchamek
 ONE Super Series Fight of the Year 2021: Rodtang Jitmuangnon vs. Danial Williams (ONE 132: ONE on TNT 1)
 ONE Super Series Knockout of the Year 2021: Superbon Banchamek against Giorgio Petrosyan (ONE 144: First Strike)
 ONE Super Series Female Fighter of the Year 2021: Janet Todd

The Apprentice: ONE Championship Edition 
Chatri Sityodtong announces a ONE Championship edition of The Apprentice who will feature 16 contestants who will be competing for a $250,000 prize and a one-year contract to work for ONE (as well as becoming the chief of staff).

Guest Athletes 
  Angela Lee
  Ben Askren
  Brandon Vera
  Demetrious Johnson
  Georges St-Pierre
  Renzo Gracie
  Rich Franklin
  Ritu Phogat
  Sage Northcutt
  Xiong Jing Nan

List of events

ONE Championship

ONE on TNT

Road to ONE

Grand Prix

2021 Kickboxing Featherweight Grand Prix

ONE Kickboxing Featherweight Grand Prix bracket

2021 Women's Atomweight Grand Prix

Background 
As the reigning ONE Atomeweight champion Angela Lee was unable to defend her title, due to becoming pregnant, ONE CEO Chatri Sityodtong announced that an atomweight Grand Prix would be held to determine the next title challenger.

The eight participants of the tournament were revealed on February 24, 2021. They included the former Rizin, Road FC and Jewels Atomweight champion Seo Hee Ham, the #1 ranked Denice Zamboanga, the #2 ranked Meng Bo, the former ONE Kickboxing and Muaythai Atomeweight champion Stamp Fairtex, as well as the non-ranked Ritu Phogat, Itsuki Hirata, Alyse Anderson and Alyona Rassohyna.

A bout between Ritu Phogat and Bi Nguyen took place at ONE Championship: Dangal for a spot in the Grand Prix. Nguyen won the close bout via split decision and Phogat was removed from the Grand Prix. Her place was taken by Julie Mezabarba and later Grace Cleveland. Phogat Rejoin Women's Atomweight World Grand Prix.

The quarterfinals are expected to take place at ONE Championship: Empower which was initially scheduled to be held on May 28, 2021, but was postponed due to the COVID-19 pandemic.

The second round of the grand prix will be determined by the fan vote.

ONE Women's Atomweight Grand Prix bracket 

 Julie Mezabarba replaced injured Seo Hee Ham at the semi-finals.
 Jenelyn Olsim replaced injured (but she was sick four days before that fight) Itsuki Hirata at the semi-finals.

ONE Championship: Unbreakable 

ONE Championship: Unbreakable (also known as ONE Championship  126)  was a Combat sport event held by ONE Championship on January 22, 2021, at the Singapore Indoor Stadium in Kallang, Singapore.

Background 
This event featured a kickboxing title fights. In the headline attraction, the reigning ONE Kickboxing Bantamweight Champion Alaverdi Ramazanov will defend his title for the first time against Capitan Petchyindee Academy. The co-main event of the evening was supposed to feature a title bout between the ONE Kickboxing Lightweight Champion Regian Eersel and Mustapha Haida, but it was reported that Haida has been forced out of the bout due to an undisclosed injury.

The card also feature a lightweight bout between the former ONE Lightweight Champion #5 ranked Shinya Aoki and the former LFA Welterweight Champion and ONE Welterweight World Title challenger James Nakashima.

Serbian heavyweight Rade Opacic was set to faces the promotional newcomer Patrick Schmid of Switzerland in a heavyweight kickboxing bout. However, a week before the event, Schmid withdrew from the bout, reportedly because one of his corner men has COVID-19. He was replaced by the promotional newcomer, Bruno Susano.

A strawweight bout between Hexigetu and Lito Adiwang was expected to take place at this event. However, Hexigetu pulled out a week before the event because his home province of Hebei, China, was put into lockdown following a recent COVID-19 spike. He was replaced by the reigning Deep Strawweight Champion Namiki Kawahara.

Results

ONE Championship: Unbreakable 2 

ONE Championship: Unbreakable 2 (also known as ONE Championship  127)  was a Combat sport event held by ONE Championship on January 22, 2021, at the Singapore Indoor Stadium in Kallang, Singapore.It was first broadcast on January 29, 2021.

Background 
The event featured the former Cage Warriors Heavyweight Champion Mauro Cerilli who made his fourth ONE appearance against the promotional newcomer Abdulbasir Vagabov in the event headliner.

In the co-main event the former Shooto Featherweight Champion Daichi Takenaka moved back to 61 kg to face the former Jungle Fight Interim Flyweight Champion Ivanildo Delfino.

Senegalese wrestler Oumar Kane made his debut against the 4-time Muay Thai champion Alain Ngalani.

Results

ONE Championship: Unbreakable 3 

ONE Championship: Unbreakable 3 (also known as ONE Championship  128) was a Combat sport event held by ONE Championship on January 22, 2021, at the Singapore Indoor Stadium in Kallang, Singapore. It was first broadcast on February 5, 2021.

Background 
The event was headlined by former kickboxing and muay thai world champion Stamp Fairtex who faced Alyona Rassohyna. In the co-main event, a bantamweight bout between #2 ranked Shoko Sato who faces Fabrício Andrade.

The remaining three bouts will feature a strawweight bout between Ryuto Sawada and Robin Catalan, a lightweight bout between Raul Raju and Ahmed Mujtaba, and a bantamweight fight between Tial Thang and Paul Lumihi. Han Zihao and Adam Noi will compete in the sole Muay Thai contest of the event.

Results

Road to ONE: Young Guns 

Road to ONE: Young Guns was a Combat sport event held by ONE Championship in partnership with Shooto on February 22, 2021, at the Tsutaya O-East in Tokyo, Japan.

Background 
The sixth edition of Road to ONE was the fourth edition held in Japan. A women's atomweight bout between Itsuki Hirata and Miku Nakamura served as the main event.

Hikaru Yoshino was scheduled to face Tomohiro Hagino in a flyweight bout, but Hagino was forced off the card on February 9 with an rib injury. Yoshino instead faced Shohei Nose, who stepped in on short notice for this encounter.

Results

ONE Championship: Fists Of Fury 

ONE Championship: Fists Of Fury (also known as ONE Championship  129) was a Combat sport event held by ONE Championship on February 26, 2021, at the Singapore Indoor Stadium in Kallang, Singapore.

Background 
The event featured a kickboxing title fight between the reigning ONE Flyweight Kickboxing World Champion Ilias Ennahachi and #2-ranked contender Superlek Kiatmuu9 as the main event of the evening. In the co-main event #1-ranked lightweight kickboxer Giorgio Petrosyan faced the former Glory Lightweight Champion Davit Kiria who made his ONE Championship debut.

Also on the card, ONE Flyweight Muay Thai World Champion Rodtang Jitmuangnon was set make his kickboxing debut against Alejandro Rivas. However, Rivas has been forced to withdraw from the contest due to health and safety protocols. Rivas was replaced by Tagir Khalilov, who stepped in on short notice for this encounter.

Hiroki Akimoto and Zhang Chenglong fought a rematch, four months after their first fight, which Akimoto won by split decision.

In the opening bout Victoria Lee, the sister of Christian Lee and Angela Lee, made her MMA debut against Sunisa Srisen.

Results

ONE Championship: Fists Of Fury 2 

ONE Championship: Fists Of Fury 2 (also known as ONE Championship  130) was a Combat sport event held by ONE Championship on February 26, 2021, at the Singapore Indoor Stadium in Kallang, Singapore. It was first broadcast on March 5, 2021.

Background 
The event was headlined by a bout between two promotional newcomers, the Iranian Amir Aliakbari has met the undefeated South Korean Kang Ji Won. The co-main event also featured the promotional debut of Anatoly Malykhin against the former ONE Light Heavyweight World Title challenger Alexandre Machado.

Results

ONE Championship: Fists Of Fury 3 

ONE Championship: Fists Of Fury 3 (also known as ONE Championship  131) was a Combat sport event held by ONE Championship on February 26, 2021, at the Singapore Indoor Stadium in Kallang, Singapore. It was first broadcast on March 19, 2021.

Background 
Regian Eersel was scheduled to make the second defense of his ONE Kickboxing Lightweight title against Islam Murtazaev, but Murtazaev had to withdraw for undisclosed reasons, and was replaced by Mustapha Haida. Eersel and Haida were originally scheduled to fight at ONE: Unbreakable, before the fight fell through when haida suffered an injury.

in the co-main event the ONE Kickboxing Atomweight champion Janet Todd has faced the former WBC Muaythai Bantamweight champion Alma Juniku, in a Muay thai bout.

Results

Road to ONE: RUF 39 

Road to ONE: RUF 39 was a Combat sport event held by ONE Championship in partnership with RUF Nation on March 13, 2021, at the Glendale Civic Center in Glendale, Arizona, United States.

Background 
The event will feature a 16-man heavyweight  tournament, with the champion receiving a US$100,000+ contract to compete in ONE Championship.

Results

ONE on TNT 1 

ONE Championship on TNT 1 (also known as ONE  Championship 132: Moraes vs. Johnson) was a Combat sport event held by ONE Championship on April 7, 2021, at the Singapore Indoor Stadium in Kallang, Singapore. This event marked the debut of ONE Championship on American television network TNT.

Background 
The reigning ONE Flyweight Muay Thai World Champion Rodtang Jitmuangnon was scheduled to fight Jacob Smith in a non-title bout. Smith withdrew before the event, and Rodtang instead faced  Danial Williams in the main event.

The co-main event featured a title bout between the 2019 ONE Flyweight Grand Prix winner and former UFC Flyweight Champion Demetrious Johnson and the reigning ONE Flyweight champion Adriano Moraes.

In the TNT opening bout, former UFC Lightweight champion Eddie Alvarez fought the former ONE Lightweight title challenger Iuri Lapicus.

A rematch between Enriko Kehl and Chingiz Allazov was the sole kickboxing match scheduled for the event. The bout was previously scheduled for One on TNT 3.,

Two heavyweight bouts were scheduled for the prelim portion of the card, first Oumar Kane against Mehdi Barghi in an MMA bout and Patrick Schmid against Rade Opacic in an kickboxing bout. However, Medhi Barghi and Rade Opacic were out of their respective bout due to health and safety protocols. Schmid and Kane have met in a short-notice MMA fight.

Results

ONE on TNT 2 

ONE Championship on TNT 2 (also known as ONE  Championship 133) was a Combat sport event held by ONE Championship on April 7, 2021, at the Singapore Indoor Stadium in Kallang, Singapore. It was first aired on April 14, 2021.

Background 
The event was headlined by a title bout between the ONE Lightweight World Champion Christian Lee and Timofey Nastyukhin.

Former ONE Featherweight champion Martin Nguyen was scheduled to fight against the #5 ranked Kim Jae Woong. However, due to health and safety protocols, Nguyen has not been cleared to compete and the bout has been removed from the card.

A heavyweight bout between Brazilian jiu-jitsu legend Marcus Almeida and Kang Ji Won was previously scheduled for ONE on TNT 2. However, Won pulled out of the fight due to undisclosed reasons and the bout was scrapped. They were replaced by an atomweight muay thai fight between the reigning ONE Kickboxing Atomweight champion Janet Todd and Anne Line Hogstad.

Dustin Joynson was originally scheduled to headline the lead card against Islam Abasov, but the Russian has withdrawn from the contest for undisclosed reasons. Joynson will instead face the promotional newcomer Kirill Grishenko, who stepped in on short notice for this bout.

The final preliminary fight was to be a muay thai bout between Pongsiri P.K.Saenchaimuaythaigym and Liam Harrison. The fight was later cancelled due to the COVID-19 situation in the UK. A bantamweight bout between Mitchell Chamale and Shuya Kamikubo replaced them.

Jarred Brooks signed a contract with ONE Championship, and is expected to make his promotional debut against Lito Adiwang at this event. The fight was later postponed, as Adiwang tested positive for COVID-19, and was replaced by a flyweight bout between Kim Kyu Sung and Wang Shuo.

Shinechagtga Zoltsetseg and Yoshiki Nakahara were scheduled to fight at featherweight in the final preliminary fight of the card.

Results

ONE on TNT 3 

ONE Championship on TNT 3 (also known as ONE  Championship 134) was a combat sport event held by ONE Championship on April 7, 2021, at the Singapore Indoor Stadium in Kallang, Singapore. It was first aired on April 21, 2021.

Background 
The event was headlined by a bantamweight fight between the former UFC bantamweight John Lineker and promotional newcomer Stephen Loman. Loman would later withdraw from the card, as he tested positive for COVID-19, and was replaced by Troy Worthen.

The co-main event saw a heavyweight bout between the Iranian Amir Aliakbari and Anatoly Malykhin. The fight was later replaced by a lightweight contest between Marat Gafurov and Ok Rae Yoon.

John Wayne Parr will make his ONE debut against the former Glory champion Nieky Holzken. It will be Parr's first fight since November 2019.

Two MMA fights were scheduled for the prelims: a flyweight bout between the #5 ranked Reece McLaren and the #4 ranked Yuya Wakamatsu.

A rematch between Enriko Kehl and Chingiz Allazov was the scheduled for the event, but the bout was moved to ONE on TNT 1.

Results

Road to ONE: Night of Warriors 17 

Road to ONE: Night of Warriors 17 was a kickboxing event held by ONE Championship in partnership with Night of Warriors on April 24, 2021, in Prague, Czech Republic.

Background 
ONE Championship held a one night 4-man qualification tournament including Tomáš Hron, Mehmet Özer, Mohamed Amine and Cyril Cereyon.

Results

Road to ONE: RUF 40 

Road to ONE: RUF 40 was a Combat sport event held by ONE Championship in partnership with RUF Nation on April 25, 2021, at the Glendale Civic Center in Glendale, Arizona, United States.

Background

Results

ONE on TNT 4 

ONE Championship on TNT 4 (also known as ONE  Championship 135: N Sang vs. De Ridder 2) was a Combat sport event held by ONE Championship on April 28, 2021, at the Singapore Indoor Stadium in Kallang, Singapore.

Background 
The event was supposed to be headlined by a trilogy bout between the ONE Light Heavyweight Champion Aung La Nsang and the former ONE Middleweight title challenger Vitaly Bigdash. Bigdash later withdrew due to a failed COVID-19 test, and was replaced by Reinier de Ridder.

A lightweight bout between Eduard Folayang and Yoshihiro Akiyama was expected for ONE on TNT 4. However, on April 3, Akiyama pulled out of the bout due to injuries sustained during his training camp. Shinya Aoki stepped in to face Folayang, Aoki was scheduled to fight Sage Northcutt in the opening bout of the main card,. but Northcutt withdrew due to lingering COVID-19 issues.

Sovannahry Em was scheduled to face Colbey Northcutt at women's flyweight. Sovannahry Em later withdrew as she sustained an injury during a pre-bout training session, and was replaced by Courtney Martin.

A flyweight Muay Thai match between Jonathan Haggerty and Elias Mahmoudi was scheduled for the prelims as well, but did not take place.

ONE CEO Chatri Sityodtong revealed that the former UFC Lightweight champion Eddie Alvarez would face the winner of Marat Gafurov versus Ok Rae-yoon. As Ok Rae Yoon won his fight Gafurov, he fought Alvarez in the co-main event.

A muay thai bout between Jackie Buntan and Ekaterina Vandaryeva, as well as a heavyweight mixed martial arts bout between Oumar Kane and Kirill Grishenko were later added to the card.

Results

ONE Championship: Dangal 

ONE Championship: Dangal  (also known as ONE  136: Vera vs. Bhullar) was a combat sport event held by ONE Championship on April 28, 2021, at the Singapore Indoor Stadium in Kallang, Singapore. It was first aired on May 15, 2021.

Background 
A ONE Heavyweight Championship bout between the current champion Brandon Vera and contender Arjan Bhullar served as the event headliner.

The co-main event was a bantamweight muay thai bout, contested between Tawanchai P.K. Saenchaimuaythaigym and Sean Clancy.

Undefeated atomweight Ritu Phogat faced Bi Nguyen.

A catchweight bout contested by Gurdarshan Mangat and Rosham Mainam also took place at this event.

The #4 ranked women's strawweight Ayaka Miura faced promotional newcomer Rayane Bastos in a 58 kg catchweight bout.

Results

ONE Championship: Full Blast 

ONE Championship: Full Blast (also known as ONE  137: Saemapetch vs. Kulabdam) was a combat sport event held by ONE Championship on May 28, 2021, at the Singapore Indoor Stadium in Kallang, Singapore.

Background 
The event was headlined by a bantamweight muay thai bout between Saemapetch Fairtex and the 2019 Lumpini Stadium 140 lbs champion Kulabdam Sor.Jor.Piek-U-Thai.

A flyweight bout between the promotional newcomer Kantharaj Shankar Agasa and the 7-fight ONE veteran Wei Xie was scheduled as the co-main event.

A featherweight bout between Ahmed Faress and Edward Kelly was scheduled for the event.

Results

ONE Championship: Full Blast 2 

ONE Championship: Full Blast 2 (also known as ONE  138: Mongkolpetch vs. Mahmoudi) was a combat sport event held by ONE Championship on June 11, 2021, at the Singapore Indoor Stadium in Kallang, Singapore.

Background 
The event will be headlined by a catchweight Muay Thai bout between Mongkolpetch Petchyindee Academy and former ONE Flyweight Kickboxing title challenger Elias Mahmoudi.

A lightweight bout between Ben Wilhelm and Amarsanaa Tsogookhuu has been scheduled as the co-main event.

A featherweight bout between Ma Jia Wen and Yoon Chang Min has been scheduled for the event.

A flyweight kickboxing bout between Wang Wenfeng and Taiki Naito has also been scheduled for the event.

Results

Road to ONE: Arena Friday Night Fights 2 

Road to ONE: Arena Friday Night Fights 2 was a Kickboxing event held by ONE Championship in partnership with Arena Friday Night Fights on June 11, 2021, at the Kovilovo resort in Belgrade, Serbia.

Background 
The event will feature a 4-man heavyweight qualification tournament to earn a sport in the Road to one Europe tournament, with the champion receiving a US$100,000+ contract to compete in ONE Championship.

Results

Road to ONE: RUF 41 

Road to ONE: RUF 41 was a mixed martial arts event held by ONE Championship in partnership with RUF Nation on June 20, 2021, at the Celebrity Theatre in Phoenix, Arizona, United States.

Background

Results

Road to ONE: Strikers Cage Championship 7 

Road to ONE: Strikers Cage Championship 7 was a Kickboxing event held by ONE Championship in partnership with Strikers Cage Championship on June 26, 2021, at the Pabellon Quico Cabrera in Tenerife, Spain.

Background 
The event will feature a 4-man heavyweight qualification tournament to earn a sport in the Road to one Europe tournament.

Results

Road to ONE: Vendetta Fight Nights 20 

Road to ONE: Vendetta Fight Nights 20 was a Kickboxing event held by ONE Championship in partnership with Vendetta fight nights on July 3, 2021, at the IBB Hamza Yerlikaya Sport Kompleksi Istanbul, Turkey.

Background 
The event will feature a 4-man heavyweight qualification tournament to earn a sport in the Road to one Europe tournament.

Results

Road to ONE: MMA Live 8 

Road to ONE: MMA Live 8 was a Combat sport event held by ONE Championship in partnership with MMA Live promotion on July 17, 2021, at the Sachsen Arena in Riesa, Germany.

Background 
The event will feature a 4-man heavyweight qualification tournament to earn a sport in the Road to one Europe tournament.

Results

ONE Championship: Battleground 

ONE Championship: Battleground (also known as ONE  139: Sam-A vs. Prajanchai) was a Combat sport event held by ONE Championship on July 30, 2021, at the Singapore Indoor Stadium in Kallang, Singapore.

Background 
The event will be headlined by a ONE Strawweight Muay Thai world title bout between Sam-A Gaiyanghadao and promotional newcomer Prajanchai P.K.Saenchaimuaythaigym.

The card also featured a middleweight bout between former two-division ONE world champion Aung La Nsang and Leandro Ataides.

A strawweight bout between Ryuto Sawada and Gustavo Balart was scheduled for the event.

Number-four featherweight kickboxer Sitthichai Sitsongpeenong will also face fifth-ranked Tayfun Ozcan in a featherweight kickboxing match. However, Ozcan was forced with withdraw due to an injury and Sitthichai was rescheduled to face Tawanchai P.K. Saenchaimuaythaigym at ONE Championship: Battleground 3 instead.

Two atomweight bouts have been scheduled: Ritu Phogat will face Lin Heqin, while Victoria Lee will face Wang Luping.

A bantamweight bout between Chen Rui and the debuting Jeremy Pacatiw has also been scheduled.

Results

Road to ONE: RUF 42 

Road to ONE: RUF 42 will be a mixed martial arts event held by ONE Championship in partnership with RUF Nation on July 31, 2021, at the Celebrity Theatre in Phoenix, Arizona, United States.

Background

Results

ONE Championship: Battleground 2 

ONE Championship: Battleground 2 (also known as ONE  140: Zhang vs. Folayang) was a Combat sport event held by ONE Championship on July 30, 2021, at the Singapore Indoor Stadium in Kallang, Singapore. It aired on August 13, 2021

Background 
The main event featured a lightweight bout between former two-time ONE Lightweight Champion Eduard Folayang and former The Ultimate Fighter: China winner Zhang Lipeng.

The card also featured a strawweight bout between former ONE Strawweight Champion Alex Silva and Miao Li Tao.

A heavyweight bout between promotional newcomer Thomas Narmo and veteran Alain Ngalani also took place on the card.

The card featured a flyweight bout between Eko Roni Saputra and Liu Peng Shuai.

Former ONE Warrior Series winner Otgonbaatar Nergui faced Rahul Raju in a lightweight bout.

Results

ONE Championship: Battleground 3 

ONE Championship: Battleground 3 (also known as ONE  141: Sitthichai vs. Tawanchai) was a Combat sport event held by ONE Championship on July 30, 2021, at the Singapore Indoor Stadium in Kallang, Singapore. It will be aired on August 27, 2021

Background 
The event featured a catchweight Muay Thai contest between Tawanchai P.K. Saenchaimuaythaigym and Sitthichai Sitsongpeenong.

Saemapetch Fairtex was originally scheduled to square off against Tawanchai PK.Saenchai Muaythaigym, with the winner getting a shot at reigning ONE Bantamweight Muay Thai World Champion. However, Saemapetch’s cornerman tested positive for COVID-19 prior to traveling to Singapore. The Fairtex athlete had been in close contact with the cornerman, so he’s been removed from ONE: BATTLEGROUND III due to Singapore’s health and safety protocols. With both of their opponents out, Sitthichai and Tawanchai have agreed to compete in a ONE Super Series featherweight Muay Thai contest.

The card also featured a strawweight bout between former ONE Strawweight Champion Dejdamrong Sor Amnuaysirichoke and Banma Duoji.

An atomweight bout between Bi Nguyen and Jenelyn Olsim was scheduled for the event.

Results

Road to ONE: RUF 43 

Road to ONE: RUF 43 will be a mixed martial arts event held by ONE Championship in partnership with RUF Nation on August 29, 2021, at the Celebrity Theatre in Phoenix, Arizona, United States.

Background

Results

ONE Championship: Empower 

ONE Championship: Empower (also known as ONE  142: Xiong vs. Nicolini) was a Combat sport event held by ONE Championship on September 3, 2021. It was originally scheduled for May 28, 2021 at the Singapore Indoor Stadium in Kallang, Singapore, before being postponed due to the COVID-19 pandemic. The event was later rescheduled for September 3.

Background 
ONE Women’s Strawweight World Champion Xiong Jing Nan returned to the ring to defend her belt for the fifth time as faced Michelle Nicolini May 28. The fight was the headliner of an all-women card. After her loss to Bi Nguyen at ONE Championship: Dangal, Ritu Phogat was removed from the Women's Atomweight Grand Prix. She was later reinstated in the Atomweight Grand Prix. Initially, Julie Mezabarba took Phogat's place before the latter was reinstated to the Grand Prix. Meksen was rescheduled to face Cristina Morales.

The event will feature the complete opening round of the Women's Atomweight Grand Prix.

Jackie Buntan was scheduled to face Daniela Lopez in a strawweight muay thai bout.

An atomweight bout between Mei Yamaguchi and Julie Mezabarba was scheduled as the opening fight of the card, as well as the World Grand Prix alternate bout.

Results

ONE Championship: Revolution 

ONE Championship: Revolution (also known as ONE  143: Lee vs. Ok) was a Combat sport event held by ONE Championship on September 24, 2021, at the Singapore Indoor Stadium in Kallang, Singapore.

Background 
The event featured 3 title fight. ONE Lightweight World Champion Christian Lee will defend his belt against #3-ranked Ok Rae Yoon as the main event. In the co main event ONE Bantamweight Kickboxing World Champion Capitan Petchyindee Academy will defend his crown against Mehdi Zatout and a trilogy fight ONE Strawweight World Champion Joshua Pacio and #1-ranked Yosuke Saruta.

Results

Road to ONE: Sexyama Edition 

Road to ONE: Sexyama Edition was a Combat sport event held by ONE Championship in partnership with Shooto on October 5, 2021, at the Tsutaya O-East in Tokyo, Japan.

Background 
This edition of Road to ONE was the fifth edition held in Japan. A flyweight bout between Tatsumitsu Wada and Daichi Takenaka served as the main event.

Results

Road to ONE: Muay Thai Grand Prix 

Road to ONE: Muay Thai Grand Prix was a Combat sport event held by ONE Championship in partnership with Muay Thai Grand Prix promotion on October, 2021 at The O2 Arena in London, United Kingdom.

Background 
The event will feature a 4-man heavyweight qualification tournament to earn a sport in the Road to one Europe tournament.

Results

ONE Championship: First Strike 

ONE Championship: First Strike (also known as ONE  145: Petrosyan vs. Superbon) was a Combat sport event held by ONE Championship on October 15, 2021, at the Singapore Indoor Stadium in Kallang, Singapore.

Background 
Giorgio Petrosyan faced Superbon Banchamek to determine the inaugural ONE Featherweight Kickboxing Championship in the main event.

The event featured the complete opening round of the kickboxing Featherweight Grand Prix.

A heavyweight kickboxing bout between Rade Opacic and Patrick Schmid took place on the opening bout.

A bantamweight Muay Thai bout between Saemapetch Fairtex and Tawanchai P.K. Saenchaimuaythaigym was scheduled for the event prelims. However, the match did not take place at this event.

Results

Road to ONE: RUF 44 

Road to ONE: RUF 44 was a Combat sport event held by ONE Championship in partnership with RUF Nation on October 23, 2021, at the Glendale Civic Center in Glendale, Arizona, United States.

Background

Results

ONE Championship: NextGen 

ONE Championship: NextGen (also known as ONE  145: Stamp vs. Mezabarba, Phogat vs. Olsim) was a Combat sport event held by ONE Championship on October 29, 2021, at the Singapore Indoor Stadium in Singapore.

Background 

In the main event, Roman Kryklia was expected to defend the ONE Light Heavyweight Kickboxing World Championship against Murat Aygun. After Aygün withdrew due to injury, he was replaced by Iraj Azizpour and the main event was changed to a title fight for the inaugural ONE Heavyweight Kickboxing World Championship. After Kryklia withdrew from the fight due to a medical issue, Azizpour faced Anderson Silva in a non-title fight.

The event featured the semi-final round of the Women's Atomweight Grand Prix. Ritu Phogat was scheduled to face Itsuki Hirata, while Stamp Fairtex was scheduled to take on Seo Hee Ham. However, Ham had to pull out of her bout due to injury and was replaced by alternate bout winner Julie Mezabarba. Hirata then had to pull out of her fight due to a high fever and was replaced by Jenelyn Olsim.

A kickboxing light heavyweight bout between the WMC Muay Thai world champion Beybulat Isaev and the former Enfusion and Superkombat champion Bogdan Stoica took place at the event. Stoica, the younger brother of ONE kickboxing light heavyweight contender Andrei Stoica, made his promotional debut.

Fight Card

ONE Championship: NextGen 2 

ONE Championship: NextGen 2 (also known as ONE  146: Saemapetch vs. Rittewada) was a Combat sport event held by ONE Championship on November 12, 2021, at the Singapore Indoor Stadium in Singapore.

Background 
The main event featured a bantamweight muay thai bout between Rittewada Petchyindee Academy and Saemapetch Fairtex. The event also featured 2 grand prix alternate bout.

Results

ONE Championship: NextGen 3 

ONE Championship: NextGen 3 (also known as ONE  147: Adiwang vs. Brooks) was a Combat sport event held by ONE Championship on November 26, 2021, at the Singapore Indoor Stadium in Singapore.

Background 
A strawweight bout between promotional newcomer Jarred Brooks and ONE veteran Lito Adiwang was scheduled for the event.

Results

ONE Championship: Winter Warriors 

ONE Championship: Winter Warriors (also known as ONE  148: Eersel vs. Murtazaev, Stamp vs. Phogat) was a Combat sport event held by ONE Championship on December 3, 2021, at the Singapore Indoor Stadium in Singapore.

Background 
This event featured a kickboxing title fights. In the headline attraction, the reigning ONE Kickboxing Lightweight Champion Regian Eersel will defend his title for the fourth time against Islam Murtazaev.

The co-main event featured the atomweight women's grand prix final between Stamp Fairtex and Ritu Phogat.

Bonus awards:

The following fighters were awarded bonuses:

 $50,000 Performance of the Night: Saygid Guseyn Arslanaliev, Timofey Nastyukhin

Results

Road to ONE: Mix Fight 49 

Road to ONE: Mix Fight 49 was a Combat sport event held by ONE Championship in partnership with Mix Fight Events promotion on December 4, 2021, at the Dinamo Sport Complex in Yerevan, Armenia.

Background 
The event will feature a 4-man heavyweight qualification tournament to earn a sport in the Road to one Europe tournament.

Results

ONE Championship: Winter Warriors 2 

ONE Championship: Winter Warriors 2(also known as ONE  149: Kingad vs. Akhmetov and ONE 149: Philippines vs. the World)  was a Combat sport event held by ONE Championship on December 17, 2021, at the Singapore Indoor Stadium in Singapore.

Background 
A flyweight bout between the #2 ranked flyweight contender Danny Kingad and the #4 ranked Kairat Akhmetov was scheduled as the main event.

A bantamweight bout between Kwon Won Il and the former ONE bantamweight champion Kevin Belingon was scheduled as the co-main event.

Vitaly Bigdash and Fan Rong were scheduled to fight in a -95 kg catchweight bout.

Bonus awards:

The following fighters were awarded bonuses:

 $50,000 Performance of the Night:

Results

Road to ONE: RUF 45 

Road to ONE: RUF 45 will be a Combat sport event held by ONE Championship in partnership with RUF Nation on December 18, 2021, at the Celebrity Theatre in Phoenix, US.

Background 
The event featured 2 quarter-finals to earn a sport in the semi-finals Road to one: RUF tournament.

Fight Card

See also 
 List of current ONE fighters
2021 in UFC
 2021 in Bellator MMA
 2021 in Rizin Fighting Federation
 2021 in Absolute Championship Akhmat
 2021 in Konfrontacja Sztuk Walki
 2021 in Fight Nights Global
 2021 in Legacy Fighting Alliance
 2021 in Glory
 2021 in K-1
 2021 in Romanian kickboxing
 2021 in Wu Lin Feng

References

External links 
ONE Championship

ONE Championship events
ONE Championship events
2021 sport-related lists
2021 in kickboxing
2021 in mixed martial arts